The men's 50 metre backstroke at the 2007 World Aquatics Championships took place on 31 March (prelims and semifinals ) and on the evening of 1 April (final) at Rod Laver Arena in Melbourne, Australia. 107 swimmers were entered in the event, of which 98 swam.

Existing records at the start of the event were:
World record (WR): 24.80, Thomas Rupprath (Germany), 27 July 2003 in Barcelona, Spain.
Championship record (CR): same

Results

Final

Semifinals

Heats

See also
Swimming at the 2005 World Aquatics Championships – Men's 50 metre backstroke (previous Worlds)
Swimming at the 2009 World Aquatics Championships – Men's 50 metre backstroke (next Worlds)

References

Swimming at the 2007 World Aquatics Championships